Raj Mittra (born 1 July 1932) is an Indian-born electrical engineer and academician. He is currently a professor of electrical engineering at University of Central Florida. Previously, he was a faculty member at University of Illinois at Urbana–Champaign and Pennsylvania State University, where he was the director of the Electromagnetic Communication Laboratory of the Electrical Engineering department. His specialities include computational electromagnetics and communication antenna design.

Biography
Mittra was born on 1 July 1932, in India. In 1950, he graduated from Agra College, Uttar Pradesh, with a Bachelor of Science in physics,  followed by a Master of Science in radio physics  received in 1953 from the University of Calcutta in Kolkata, India and a Ph.D. in electrical engineering in 1957 from the University of Toronto in Canada.

Professional career 
In 1957, Mittra became a visiting assistant professor in the Electrical and Computer Engineering Department at the University of Illinois in Urbana, Illinois. In 1961 he was promoted to associate professor, and in 1966 to full professor.  At this time he also became the associate director of the Electromagnetics Laboratory.  In 1984, he was named the director of its Electromagnetic Communication Laboratory, and continued to work at the University of Illinois until he retired in 1996.

After a short retirement, later in 1996 Mittra took a professor position at Penn State in the Electrical Engineering Department.  He founded and was appointed as the director of its Electromagnetic Communication Laboratory.  He still holds these positions in 2013. In 2015, he moved to Orlando, Florida and became a professor at University of Central Florida.

He served a one-year term as president of the IEEE Antennas and Propagation Society (AP-S) from 1976 to 1977.  He became president of RM Associates, a consulting firm, in 1980 and remains so in 2013.  He was elected to the board of directors of the Electromagnetics Society in 1978. He was the editor for the Transactions Antennas and Propagation Society from 1980 to 1983 and International Journal of Electronics and Communications from 1975 to 2001.

Research and publications 

Mittra's research interests include communication antenna design, computational electromagnetics, electromagnetic modeling and simulation of electronic packages, electromagnetic compatibility (EMC) analysis, and radio scattering.

Books authored or co-authored 

R. Mittra, and S. W. Lee, Analytical Techniques in the Theory of Guided Waves, McMillan and Company, 1971. 
D. Bouche, F. Molinet, and R. Mittra, Asymptotic Methods in Electromagnetics, Springer-Verlag, 1997. 
A. F. Peterson, S. L. Ray, and R. Mittra, Computational Methods for Electromagnetics, The IEEE/OUP Series on Electromagnetic Wave Theory and Oxford University Press, 1997. 
Wenhua Yu and Raj Mittra, CFDTD: Conformal Finite-Difference Time-Domain Maxwell's Equations Solver, Software and User's Guide, Artech House Publisher, 2004. 
Yinchao Chen, Qunsheng Cao, Raj Mittra, Multiresolution Time Domain Scheme for Electromagnetic Engineering, A John Wiley & Sons, Inc., Publication, January 2005. 
Wenhua Yu, Raj Mittra, Tao Su, Yongjun Liu and Xiaoling Yang, Parallel Finite-Difference Time-Domain Method," Artech House Publisher, July 2006.

Books edited or co-edited 

R. Mittra, Numerical and Asymptotic Techniques for Electromagnetics, Springer-Verlag, 1975. 
R. Mittra, and H. L. Maanders, "Spectral theory of diffraction," Modern Topics in Electromagnetics and Antennas, Peter Peregrines Ltd., New York, 1977. 
R. Mittra, W. A. Imbriale, and E. J. Maanders, Satellite Communication Antenna Technology, North-Holland, 1983. 
R. Mittra, Computer Techniques for Electromagnetics, Pergamon Press, 1973. Revised, Hemisphere Publishing Corporation, 1987. 
A. Guran, R. Mittra, and P. J Moser, Eds., Electromagnetic Wave Interactions With a foreword by Hans A. Bethe, World Scientific, New Jersey, 1996. 
Douglas H. Werner and Raj Mittra, Frontiers in Electromagnetics, IEEE Press, 1999.

Awards 
He has received the following awards:
IEEE James H. Mulligan, Jr. Education Medal – 2011
IEEE Electromagnetics Award – 2006
AP-S Chen-To Tai Distinguished Educator Award – 2004
IEEE/AP-S Distinguished Achievement Award – 2002
IEEE Millennium medal – 2000
IEEE Centennial Medal – 1984

References

External links 
Publications
http://www.researchgate.net/profile/Raj_Mittra/
http://www.lapconf.co.uk/guest-speakers
http://journals.tubitak.gov.tr/elektrik/issues/elk-08-16-1/elk-16-1-1-0802-8.pdf
https://news.psu.edu/story/584498/2019/08/21/administration/former-faculty-member-and-spouse-commit-4-million-electrical

Living people
1932 births
University of Calcutta alumni
University of Toronto alumni
University of Illinois Urbana-Champaign faculty
Indian electrical engineers
Pennsylvania State University faculty
Indian expatriates in the United States
Engineers from Uttar Pradesh
IEEE Centennial Medal laureates
Electrical engineering academics
Microwave engineers
University of Central Florida faculty
American academics of Indian descent
Indian scholars
American textbook writers
Indian textbook writers